The Roman Catholic  Diocese of Tarahumara is a suffragan diocese of the Archdiocese of Chihuahua. It was erected as a mission sui juris in 1950 and was elevated, first to a vicariate apostolic in 1958, then to a diocese in 1993.

Ordinaries
Salvador Martinez Aguirre, S.J. (1958–1973) 
José Alberto Llaguno Farias, S.J. (1975–1992) 
José Luis Dibildox Martínez (1993–2003) 
Rafael Sandoval Sandoval, M.N.M. (2005– )

Episcopal see
Guachochi, Chihuahua

External links and references

Tarahumara
Tarahumara, Roman Catholic Diocese of
Tarahumara
Tarahumara